Mannaru is a 2012 Indian Tamil-language drama film directed by Jai Shankar and starring Appukutty and Swathi.

Plot

Cast

Reception 
A critic from The Times of India gave the film 2/5 and criticised the subplot and numerous flashbacks. A critic from News18 wrote that "The highlight is Jai Shankar's sincere attempt to stay away from the clich's. The film begins on a sweet note and proceeds the same way all through".

A critic from Sify wrote that "Once again Appukutty goes through the village simpleton act which he does with consummate ease, in a film which has no story or script". A critic from Maalai Malar praised the film, but called the concept old. A critic from Dinamalar called the film average, but praised Appukutty's performance.

References

External links 

2012 films
2012 drama films
Indian drama films
2010s Tamil-language films